Jean Marcel Lefebvre (3 October 1919 – 9 July 2004) was a French film actor.

His erratic studies were interrupted by World War II. Taken prisoner and then requisitioned as a laborer, he escaped to join his family evacuated near Châteauroux and Neuvy-Saint-Sépulcre. He was a tram driver time in Limoges and seller of underwear. At the end of the war he returned to his home, in his house in Valenciennes, where he worked briefly for his father, and then entered the Conservatoire in Paris in 1948.

Selected filmography

1934: Judex – Roger de Trémeuse
1947: Un flic – Un jeune homme chez le coiffeur (uncredited)
1951: Bouquet de joie – Georges
1952: Une fille sur la route – Loulou – le pianiste
1952: L'amour toujours l'amour – Jacques
1955: Les Diaboliques – Le soldat
1955: La villa Sans-Souci
1955: Cherchez la femme – Joe
1955: Gas-Oil – Le chauffeur de car 
1955: Une fille épatante – Le trombone
1955: La Meilleure Part – Raymond – un ouvrier
1956: Les Indiscrètes – Laroche
1956: The Adventures of Gil Blas – Scipion
1956: Naughty Girl – Jérôme's pal
1956: The Lebanese Mission – La Pie
1956: L'Homme et l'Enfant – Albert
1956: And God Created Woman – L'homme qui veut danser 
1957: The Seventh Commandment – Edouard, le fils d'Amélie
1957: Que les hommes sont bêtes – Francis
1957: L'Ami de la famille – Le Jardinier
1957: Méfiez-vous fillettes – Matz
1957: Nous autres à Champignol – Un soldat romain / Un roi mérovingien / Henri III / Un mousquetaire / Le zouave du pont de l'Alma / Un homme en exode (uncredited)
1957: La Polka des menottes – L'inspecteur Martial
1957: Send a Woman When the Devil Fails – Fred
1958:  – Mauvin
1958: The Amorous Corporal – Potirond
1958: Tabarin – Julien
1958: En légitime défense – Georges
1958:  The Daughter of Hamburg – Georges
1958: Sunday Encounter – Le réceptionniste
1959: Houla-Houla – Le gendarme farfelu
1962: Les Moutons de Panurge – Cameo appearance (uncredited)
1962: La Belle Américaine  – Chougnasse, le chef comptable
1962: Les Ennemis – Le médecin du contre-espionnage
1962: La Vendetta – Colombo
1962: Konga Yo – Jean
1962: Love on a Pillow – Armand (uncredited)
1962: Gigot – Gaston
1962: The Gentleman from Epsom –  Charly le "tubeur"
1962: Un clair de lune à Maubeuge – Un mineur
1962: Le roi des montagnes – Basile
1963: The Bamboo Stroke – L'auvergnat
1963: People in Luck – Le marin (segment "Le yacht")
1963: Les Grands Chemins – Card Player
1963: Les tontons flingueurs – Paul Volfoni
1963: Chair de poule – Priest
1963: Bébert et l'Omnibus – Balissard
1964: Faites sauter la banque! – Le contremaître / The overseer
1964: La Mort d'un tueur – Tony
1964: Monsieur – Le detective privé
1964: Une souris chez les hommes – Le surveillant
1964: Paris champagne
1964: Relax Darling – Blaise
1964: Le gendarme de Saint-Tropez – Maréchal des Logis Lucien Fougasse
1964: The Counterfeit Constable – Le supporter saoul avec le coq
1964: The Gorillas – L'électro
1965: Les Copains – Le restaurateur / Waiter
1965: La Bonne Occase – Le pompiste
1965: The Sleeping Car Murders – (uncredited)
1965: Quand passent les faisans – Arsène Baudu
1965: Les Bons Vivants – Léonard Maburon (segment "Procès, Le")
1965: Le gendarme à New York – Maréchal des Logis Lucien Fougasse
1966: Angelique and the King – L'apothicaire (uncredited)
1966: Ne nous fâchons pas – Léonard Michalon
1966: Un garçon, une fille. Le dix-septième ciel – Le plongeur
1966: The Mona Lisa Has Been Stolen – Gardien
1966: Trois enfants dans le désordre – Fernand
1966: Le Solitaire passe à l'attaque – Robert Le Goff
1967: An Idiot in Paris – Goubi
1967: Du mou dans la gâchette – Léon Dubois
1967: Le Fou du labo 4 – Eugène Ballanchon
1968: Benjamin – Azay (uncredited)
1968: Un drôle de colonel – Cutterfeet
1968: Le gendarme se marie – Maréchal des Logis Lucien Fougasse
1969: Le bourgeois gentil mec – Jean Gentil
1970: Le gendarme en balade – Maréchal des Logis Lucien Fougasse
1970: L'Âne de Zigliara – Gégé
1972: L'ingénu – Abbé de Kerkabon
1972: Bluebeard – Greta's Father
1972: Treasure Island – Ben Gunn
1973: Quelques messieurs trop tranquilles – Julien Michalon
1973: J'ai mon voyage ! – M. Cartier
1973: The Mysterious Island
1973: La valise – Le bagagiste / Baggage Man
1973: Le Solitaire – Un gardien 'La Carlingue'
1973: Le Magnifique – The electrician
1973: Mais où est donc passé la 7ème compagnie? – Pitivier
1974: Le plumard en folie – Adrien
1974: Commissariato di notturna – Dindino
1974: Comme un pot de fraises – Adrien
1974: C'est jeune et ça sait tout – Charles Lebrun
1974: Impossible Is Not French – Louis Brisset
1975: C'est pas parce qu'on a rien à dire qu'il faut fermer sa gueule – Riton
1975: Pas de problème – Edmond Michalon
1975: On a retrouve la 7eme Compagnie – Pitivier
1975: La situation est grave… mais pas désespérée – Bertrand Duvenois
1976: Le Jour de gloire – Grégoire
1976: Le Chasseur de chez Maxim's – Le chanoine
1977: Casanova & Co. – The Sergeant
1977: Le maestro – Alexis Kemper
1977: La septième compagnie au clair de lune – Pithivier
1978: Freddy – Frédéric Corban dit 'Freddy'
1978: Ils sont fous ces sorciers – Julien Picard
1978: Plein les poches pour pas un rond... – Julien
1979: Tendrement vache – Henri Duchemin
1979: Duos sur canapé – Victor, le valet
1980: Les Borsalini – Momo Bichonnet
1981: Le Chêne d'Allouville – Albert Lecourt
1981: Prends ta Rolls et va pointer – Camille Vignault
1982: N'oublie pas ton père au vestiaire... – Antoine Chevrier
1982: On n'est pas sorti de l'auberge – Félix
1983: Le braconnier de Dieu – Vincent Espérandieu
1983: Salut la puce – Robert 'Capitaine' Dumourier
1985: Le Gaffeur – Gabriel Duchemin
1989: À deux minutes près – Le mari de la matrone
1989: La Folle Journée ou le Mariage de Figaro – Bazile
2001: Fifi Martingale – Gaston Manzanarès

Notes

External links
 

1919 births
2004 deaths
French male film actors
People from Valenciennes
French World War II forced labourers
French escapees
Escapees from Nazi concentration camps
French prisoners of war in World War II